Rūmī is a crater on Mercury. Its name was adopted by the International Astronomical Union (IAU) in 1985. Rūmī is named for the Persian poet Rumi.

There is an irregular depression in the center of the floor of Rūmī crater.

A scarp known as Palmer Rupes cuts across Rūmī and extends to the southwest.

References

Impact craters on Mercury